Ypsolopha mienshani is a moth of the family Ypsolophidae. It is known from Shanxi in China.

References

Ypsolophidae
Moths of Asia